The freestyle skiing competition of the 1998 Winter Olympics was held at Iizuna Kogen Ski Area.  There were four events, taking place between 8 and 18 February 1998.

Medal summary

Medal table

Men's Events

Women's Events

Participating NOCs
Twenty-five nations participated in freestyle skiing at Nagano. Armenia, the Czech Republic, Denmark, New Zealand and Portugal made their debuts in the sport.

References

External links

 
1998
1998 Winter Olympics events
1998 in freestyle skiing